Polynucleobacter difficilis is an aerobic, catalase- and oxidase-positive, chemo-organotrophic, nonmotile, freshwater bacterium of the genus Polynucleobacter, isolated from the Lake Sevan from a depth of 60 m in Armenia.

References

External links
Type strain of Polynucleobacter difficilis at BacDive -  the Bacterial Diversity Metadatabase

Burkholderiaceae
Bacteria described in 2012